René Souchon (born 12 March 1943 in Le Malzieu-Ville, Lozère) is the regional president of the French region of Auvergne. He was first elected in 2006. He is a member of the Socialist Party.

References

1943 births
Living people
People from Lozère
French Ministers of Agriculture
Socialist Party (France) politicians